Sir Robert John Collie  (15 August 1860 –4 April 1935) was a Scottish doctor and public servant who also served as National Liberal Party MP for Glasgow Partick from 1922 to 1923.

Background
He was the fourth son of James Collie, of Pitfodels, Aberdeenshire. He was educated at Aberdeen University. He married, in 1886 Jessie Edgar of Locharwoods, Dumfriesshire. They had one son. He was knighted in 1912. He was made a Companion of the Order of St Michael and St George in 1918. He was appointed a Deputy Lieutenant. He was a Justice of the peace in the County of London. His wife Jessie died in 1928.

Professional career
He was Chief Medical Officer Metropolitan Water Board; Consulting Medical Officer to the Ministry of Pensions; Hon. Member Massachusetts Society of Physicians; Medical Examiner to the London County Council; Vice-President Medico-Legal Society; Member Royal Commission on Venereal Diseases, 1913–15; Temporary and Honorary Colonel Auxiliary Medical Services (despatches); Director of Medical Services, Ministry of Pensions; President Special Medical Board for Neurasthenia; Home Office Medical Referee Workmen's Compensation Act.

Political career
He was a Lloyd George supporting National Liberal candidate for the Partick Division of Glasgow at the 1922 General Election. In 1918 Partick had been won by a Lloyd George supporting Liberal, who had decided to retire. Collie was adopted by Partick Liberal Association in April 1922. Collie's only opponent was also a Liberal, who was supported by the Liberals led by H. H. Asquith. Collie had the approval of the Partick Unionist Association. He comfortably won the seat;

In parliament he voted against a Unionist government amendment to the Safeguarding of Industries Act 1921 in which he joined with other Liberals in support of Free trade. In 1923 he introduced a Merchant Shipping Acts Amendment Bill, however before the bill had the chance to be passed, the Unionist Prime Minister Stanley Baldwin dissolved parliament to have an election on his policies of introducing trade tariffs.  The two wings of the Liberal party united in support of free trade and Collie gave them his full support. However, he decided not to defend his seat and retired from parliament.

Publications
Fraud and its Detection in Accident Insurance Claims, 1912
Malingering, 1913 
The Psychology of the Fraudulent Mind, 1913
The Business Side of Medical Practice
Fraud in Medico-legal practice, 1932
Workman's Compensation in its Medical Aspect, 1933
Edited Recent Advances in Medicine and Surgery, 1933

External links 
National Portrait Gallery: http://www.npg.org.uk/collections/search/person/mp61155/sir-john-collie?search=sas&sText=Sir+John+Collie+&OConly=true

References

1860 births
1935 deaths
Members of the Parliament of the United Kingdom for Glasgow constituencies
UK MPs 1922–1923
National Liberal Party (UK, 1922) politicians
Alumni of the University of Aberdeen
19th-century Scottish medical doctors
20th-century Scottish medical doctors
Knights Bachelor
Companions of the Order of St Michael and St George